The canton of Cérilly is a former administrative division in central France. It was disbanded following the French canton reorganisation which came into effect in March 2015. It consisted of 12 communes, which joined the canton of Bourbon-l'Archambault in 2015. It had 5,947 inhabitants (2012).

The canton comprised the following communes:

Ainay-le-Château
Braize
Cérilly
Isle-et-Bardais
Lételon
Meaulne
Saint-Bonnet-Tronçais
Theneuille
Urçay
Valigny
Le Vilhain
Vitray

Demographics

See also
Cantons of the Allier department

References

Former cantons of Allier
2015 disestablishments in France
States and territories disestablished in 2015

Canton of Cérilly